PF-4800567 is a drug developed by Pfizer which acts as a selective inhibitor of the enzyme Casein kinase 1 epsilon (CK1-ε), and has mainly been used in the study of the casein kinase 1 enzymes in the regulation of circadian rhythm, as well as showing potential neuroprotective effects. While this research has shown that circadian rhythm is modulated primarily by the alternate isoform CK1-δ rather than CK1-ε, both PF-4800567 and the related non-selective CK1-δ/ε inhibitor PF-670462 were found in animal studies to enhance responses to certain drugs of abuse such as methamphetamine and fentanyl, which suggests a role for CK1-ε in negative regulation of sensitivity to stimulant and opioid drugs.

References 

Enzyme inhibitors
Pfizer brands